Avelan Apartments is a historic three-story building in Ogden, Utah. It was built in 1921 for investor William J. Stephens, and named for one of his sons. 
It is an unusually long, narrow building, with its narrow end to the street.  It has 60 apartments.

The building has been listed on the National Register of Historic Places since December 31, 1987.

It is located on the south side of 27th Ave. in Ogden, at number 449, and is adjacent to the similar La Frantz Apartments, also National Register-listed.

References

Buildings and structures in Ogden, Utah
National Register of Historic Places in Weber County, Utah
Residential buildings completed in 1921
1921 establishments in Utah